The 2022–23 Florida A&M Rattlers basketball team represented Florida A&M University in the 2022–23 NCAA Division I men's basketball season. The Rattlers, led by sixth-year head coach Robert McCullum, played their home games at the Al Lawson Center in Tallahassee, Florida as members of the Southwestern Athletic Conference.

Previous season
The Rattlers finished the 2021–22 season 13–17, 11–7 in SWAC play to finish in fourth place. As the No. 4 seed, they were defeated by No. 5 seed Alabama A&M in the quarterfinals of the SWAC tournament.

Roster

Schedule and results

|-
!colspan=12 style=""| Non-conference regular season

|-
!colspan=12 style=""| SWAC regular season

Sources

References

Florida A&M Rattlers basketball seasons
Florida AandM Rattlers
Florida AandM Rattlers basketball
Florida AandM Rattlers basketball